Group A of the 2012 Fed Cup Asia/Oceania Zone Group II was one of two pools in the Asia/Oceania zone of the 2012 Fed Cup. Five teams competed in a round robin competition, with the teams proceeding to their respective sections of the play-offs: the top team played for advancement to the 2013 Group I.

Singapore vs. Sri Lanka

Kyrgyzstan vs. Pakistan

Hong Kong vs. Sri Lanka

Singapore vs. Pakistan

Hong Kong vs. Pakistan

Singapore vs. Kyrgyzstan

Hong Kong vs. Singapore

Kyrgyzstan vs. Sri Lanka

Hong Kong vs. Kyrgyzstan

Pakistan vs. Sri Lanka

References

External links
 Fed Cup website

2012 Fed Cup Asia/Oceania Zone